The deputy speakers of the House of Representatives of the Philippines are the second highest-ranking officials of the House of Representatives of the Philippines. During the absence of the House speaker, one of the House deputy speakers will preside over the House of Representatives.

From 17th to 18th Congress, the House increased the numbers of deputy speakers to cater the supposed move to federalism.

, there are nine deputy speakers of the House of Representatives.

Duties and powers
The duties and powers of the House deputy speakers, as contained in the House rules, are the following:
to assume the duties and powers of the speaker when so chosen by a majority vote or by lot among themselves, as the case may be, when the Speaker is absent or temporarily incapacitated, until such time that the Speaker returns to the performance of his/her duties; and, in case of resignation, removal, permanent incapacity or death of the Speaker, until such time that a new Speaker is elected and qualified;
to preside over the session when, even if present, the Speaker does not preside, or has not designated any other member as temporary presiding officer as provided in Section 14(h) of Rule IV;
to monitor, coordinate and facilitate action on measures filed, requests, and other concerns of members representing constituencies in any of the island groups namely Luzon, Visayas and Mindanao, to which they may be assigned by the Speaker;
to recommend to the Speaker appropriate policies, strategies and programs of action to improve the pace and quality of legislation and to effectively address issues and concerns of members on matters affecting them, their constituencies, and the overall operations and integrity of the House;
to appoint personnel of the House when so authorized by the Speaker; and
to perform such other duties and functions as may be assigned and/or delegated by the Speaker.

List

''Note: Deputy Speaker of the House of Representatives of the Philippines was previously called Speaker Pro-Tempore of the House of Representatives of the Philippines. The title was used until 1995.

See also
Majority Floor Leader of the House of Representatives of the Philippines
Minority Floor Leader of the House of Representatives of the Philippines

References

External links
House of Representatives of the Philippines

 
Legislative deputy speakers
Political office-holders in the Philippines